is a passenger railway station located in the city of Himeji, Hyōgo Prefecture, Japan, operated by the private Sanyo Electric Railway.

Lines

Station layout
The station consists of two unnumbered ground-level side platforms connected by a level crossing. The station building and sole entrance is located at the south east end of the Sanyo-Aboshi bound platform. The station is unattended.

Platforms

Adjacent stations

|-
!colspan=5|Sanyo Electric Railway

History
It was renamed March 27,1941.

Passenger statistics
In fiscal 2018, the station was used by an average of 1047 passengers daily (boarding passengers only).

Surrounding area
Nippon Steel Setouchi Steel Works
Hirohata Civic Center
 Himeji Nishi Health Center

See also
List of railway stations in Japan

References

External links

 Official website (Sanyo Electric Railway) 

Railway stations in Japan opened in 1940
Railway stations in Himeji